Sylvester J. Pussycat Jr., simply known as Sylvester Jr., is an animated cartoon character in the Warner Bros. Looney Tunes and Merrie Melodies series. He was created by Robert McKimson.

Appearances
Sylvester Jr. appeared in the following shorts:
 Pop 'im Pop! (1950)
 Who's Kitten Who? (1952)
 Cats a-Weigh (1953)
 Too Hop to Handle (1956)
 The Slap-Hoppy Mouse (1956)
 Mouse-Taken Identity (1957)
 Cat's Paw (1959) (no Hippety Hopper)
 Tweet Dreams (1959) (no Hippety Hopper) (note: flashback cameo in a Tweety and Sylvester cartoon)
 Goldimouse and the Three Cats (1960) (no Hippety Hopper) (note: the only short directed by Friz Freleng to feature Sylvester Jr. and the only cartoon where his mother appears)
 Birds of a Father (1961) (no Hippety Hopper)
 Fish and Slips (1962) (no Hippety Hopper)
 Claws in the Lease (1963) (no Hippety Hopper)
 Freudy Cat (1964)

Later appearances
After the original Looney Tunes shorts, Junior would show up sporadically in later years. In the 1990s animated series The Sylvester & Tweety Mysteries, Sylvester has a flashback to his childhood in the episode "A Mynah Problem"; in the flashback sequence, young Sylvester looks like Sylvester and, while Sylvester his father looks like the adult Sylvester. 

He also appears in Space Jam.

He is seen in one of the "Mysterious Phenomenon of the Unexplained" shorts of the Stranger Than Fiction Looney Tunes web shorts compilation DVD alongside his father on a camping trip interrupted by Bigfoot.

He appears as a boss in the third world in the video game The Bugs Bunny Birthday Blowout, riding his skateboard.

References

Looney Tunes characters
Male characters in animation
Child characters in television
Film characters introduced in 1950
Anthropomorphic cats